Spirit is the 44th studio album by country music singer Willie Nelson. The album differs from Nelson's other albums because of the use of fewer instruments (two guitars, piano, fiddle) and has a more classical/Spanish influence than others. Nelson's sister Bobbie plays piano.

Track listing 
All songs written by Willie Nelson.
"Matador" - 1:42
"She Is Gone" - 2:55
"Your Memory Won't Die in My Grave" - 3:27
"I'm Not Trying to Forget You" - 3:53
"Too Sick to Pray" - 2:40
"Mariachi" - 2:06
"I'm Waiting Forever" - 3:09
"We Don't Run" - 3:02
"I Guess I've Come to Live Here in Your Eyes" - 3:36
"It's a Dream Come True" - 3:59
"I Thought About You, Lord" - 4:11
"Spirit of E9" - 4:58
"Matador"

Personnel 

Willie Nelson - Lead guitar, Vocals, Producer
Bobbie Nelson - Piano
Johnny Gimble - Fiddle
Jody Payne - Rhythm guitar, Backing vocals
Technical
Recorded and Mixed by Joe Gracey
Second Engineer - Gabe Rhodes
Recorded at Pedernales Recording in Austin, Texas
Edited at Terra Nova Digital Austin
Mastered by Denny Purcell and Joe Gracey at Georgetown
Mastering in Nashville, Tennessee
Photography - Chris Buck
Artwork - David Zetter
Design - Red Herring Design

Chart performance

References

1996 albums
Willie Nelson albums
Island Records albums